Ocean Songs is the fourth major album by Australian rock band Dirty Three, released in March 1998 by Touch and Go Records. The album was recorded at Electrical Audio, Chicago, United States, during August and September 1997. The cover art was designed by guitarist Mick Turner. On some tracks David Grubbs plays piano and harmonium.

A special release version was issued by their UK record label Bella Union in 2005 that contained the original album along with a live DVD.

In 2005, the album was performed live in London in its entirety as part of the All Tomorrow's Parties-curated Don't Look Back series, a performance that was later repeated in Barcelona and Mt Buller, Australia and as part of the 2009 ATP New York Festival (curated then by The Flaming Lips).

Reception

Rolling Stone Australia said, "Eschewing the now patented violin-led raveups, the Dirty Three turned the atmosphere up to 11. With Warren Ellis playing sans distortion for the first time, Ocean Songs ebbs and flows with its own inevitable momentum: quiet, reflective and painstakingly slow."

AllMusic considered the album "easily their most controversial, and a decided change in direction. The music here keeps all tempos reigned in and all instrumental flurries to a minimum, creating the feeling of waves lapping and pouring into and out of one another. It's as if the D3 were on a vessel, playing to the ocean itself."

In October 2010, Ocean Songs was listed in the book, 100 Best Australian Albums.

Track listing
"Sirena" – 4:06
"The Restless Waves" – 5:09
"Distant Shore" – 5:50
"Authentic Celestial Music" – 10:04
"Backwards Voyager" – 4:34
"Last Horse on the Sand" – 4:52
"Sea Above, Sky Below" – 6:04
"Black Tide" – 4:35
"Deep Waters" – 16:27
"Ends of the Earth" – 5:11

Special Edition DVD
 "Last Horse on the Sand"
 "Distant Shore"
 "Authentic Celestial Music"
 "Sue's Last Ride"
 "Deep Waters"

References 

1998 albums
Dirty Three albums
Albums produced by Steve Albini
Touch and Go Records albums